Raga Bihag is a Hindustani classical raga belonging to the Bilaval thaat. It is a melodious Raaga for beginners as well as experts. Raga Bihag uses all seven music swars. In Bihag, both the Madhyams (Shuddha & teevra) are used. The Shuddha Madhyam is more prominent; Teevra Madhyama is only used with Panchama in the phrase PA MA' GA MA GA.

In Avaroha, Rishabh and Dhaivat are not used as resting notes, but they are used in meend. In this raag, Nishad is a prominent note, and aalaps or taans are generally started from this note.

Theory

Aroha and avaroha 
Aroha
 Sa Ga ma Pa Ni Sa

Avaroha
Sa* Ni Da Pa Ma Ga Ri Sa

Structure 
Raag Bihag is a beautiful raag. If the number of Nyaas swaras in a raga is more and its chalan is not complicated (vakra), then the raag is quite expandable. Besides being melodious, Bihag is quite expandable due to many Nyaas swars. In Bihag, the nyaas are mainly on Gandhaar. Hence Gandhaar is referred to as the Vaadi swar (main swar), and Nishaad is called Samvadi swar (second-most prominent swar). Along with Gandhaar and Nishaad, the presence of Nyaas is also felt in Shadja and Pancham.

Purvaang pradhan 
The Vaadi swar of raag Bihag is in purvaang (first half of the octave). The raag is said to be "Purvaang Pradhan" if the vaadi swar is in the purvaang (Sa, Re, Ga, Ma, Pa) and the raag is said to be "Uttarang Pradhan" if the vadi swar is in the Uttarang (MA, PA, DHA, NI, SA^). Hence, raag Bihag is "Purvaang Pradhan" raag.

Hence, Bihag seems to blossom more in the Mandra and Madhya saptak (lower and middle octave).

Aalap 
The phrase "PA MA' GA MA GA" is the characteristic RAAGVAACHAK phrase of Bihag raag. Also, in Bihag, we get to see the VAADI-SANVAADI interactions in the aalap. Also, SHADJA-PANCHAM BHAAV is seen between GANDHAAR and NISHAAD, which adds to its beauty. As the Vaadi swar of the raag is GA, most of the gaayaki of the raag of Bihag revolves around GA.

For example:
NI* SA GA MA GA
PA* NI* SA GA NI* SA GA
SA GA MA GA 
PA MA' GA MA GA
GA MA PA NI DHA_PA MA' GA MA GA
(Not in sargam)

As NI is the Sanvaadi swar of Bihag, it plays a pivotal role in developing the raag. GA-NI interactions are the Demonstrative phrases of Bihag.
The phrases of GA-NI interactions are as follows:
GA MA PA NI DHA_PA MA' GA MA GA
NI DHA _PA......PA_MA' PA MA' GA MA GA

As Bihag is "PURVAANG PRADHAAN" raag, the aalapi mainly blossoms in the MANDRA and MADHYA saptak. There is special importance of Mandra PANCHAM in the initial development of raag. Also Pancham plays an important role in the raag in Madhya Saptak.

Some of the phrases demonstrating Mandra PANCHAM are as follows:
SA NI* DHA*_PA*.........
PA* NI* SA GA.......
PA* NI* SA GA NI* SA GA.........

The phrases demonstrating nyaas on pancham are as follows:
NI* SA GA MA PA.....
SA GA MA PA........
GA MA PA NI....DHA_PA........

Also the Taar SHADJA adds to the beauty of the raag. Even though Bihag is a PURVAANG PRADHAN raag, it also sounds peaceful in the TAAR SAPTAK (higher octave).

Vadi and sanvadi 
Vadi
The Vadi swar is Ga.

Samavadi
The Samavadi swar is Ni.

Pakad or chalan 
Bihag uses both shuddha Ma (ma) and teevra Ma (Ma).
It has the pakad Pa Ma Pa Ga ma Ga.

Both Rishabh and Dhaivat are VARJYA (prohibited) in Aaroha (ascent), but they are used in the Avaroha (way down) in the form of meend.

Organization and relationships 
The raag originates from thaat Bilaval; however, many believe it originates from thaat Kalyan, just because the raag comprises both Madhyams. However, the aesthetics of the raag develop with the bilaval style and pt. V. N. Bhatkhande, in his book has mentioned the thaat of raag Bihag as bilaval.

The Teevra madhyam was used as vivadi swar in the traditional raag Bihag, but in recent times, the Teevra Ma is widely used in Bihag. It is only used in the avarohi pattern. It is always used with PA in phrases such as PA MA' GA MA GA, NI DHA_PA MA' GA MA GA, etc. The Swaras, Rishabh and Dhaivat are varjya in the aaroh. All the swaras are used in the avaroh. Hence the Jaati of this raag is considered Odhav-Sampoorna.

Bihag is usually assigned to the Thaat Bilaval. Its Chalan is very close to bilaval thaat. But if Teevra Madhyam is given more importance, Bihag seems more akin to Kalyan Thaat.

Samay (time) 
Bihag is played in the second quarter of the night. According to the experts, Bihag is a PURVAANG PRADHAN Raag. "ALL THE PURVAANG PRADHAN RAAGS ARE PURVA RAAGS". Hence, Bihag is a purva raag. All the Purva raags are sung/played between 12 p.m.- 12 a.m. Raag Bihag is sung/played between 9 p.m. and 12 a.m., i.e. second part of the night.

Origins 
The origin can be traced back to pure classical ragas widely prevalent in the 16th century, and in many folk songs in the Vaishnava period (14th to 18th centuries). It is used in many songs of Tagore and in various Bengali and north Indian compositions.

Marathi theatre 
In the Marathi Natak "SUVARNATULA", the song "PAAARIJAAT PHULALA", composed by 'Vidyadhar Gokhale' is in raag Bihag.

Film Songs 
A portion of the alap of Bihag may be seen in a scene from Satyajit Ray's 1958 film Jalsaghar, played by the surbahar player Wahid Khan, from 29:50 to 31:58. Dil cheez kya hai from Umrao Jaan contains elements of Bihag.

The song "Hamare Dil Se Na Jana" from the film Udan Khatola is based on Bihag. The song "Tere Sur Aur Mere Geet" from Goonj Uthi Shehnai is based on Bihag, when shehnai maestro Ustad Bismillah Khan appeared in film music.

The song "Malargal Kaettaen" from Oh Kadal Kanmani sung by Chitra and A.R. Rahman composed by latter is based on Bihag.

The song "Piya Bawari" sung by Asha Bhosle and composed by R.D. Burman from Khubsoorat is based on Bihag.

Film songs

Language: Tamil

Language: Kannada 

Language : Hindi

Theatre 
In the Kannada Yakshagana play Maatanado mativanta preeta composition of Shahiprabha Parinaya the prasanga (plot) is in Bihag.

References

External links 
 
 SRA on Samay and Ragas
 SRA on Ragas and Thaats
 Rajan Parrikar on Ragas
 More details about raga Bihag

Hindustani ragas